Barombong Stadium is a stadium in City of Makassar, South Sulawesi, Indonesia. It is mostly used for football matches and is the new home stadium of PSM Makassar.

The stadium was built in late January 2011, in  Part of the tribune has collapsed because of heavy rains that hit the City of Makassar.

References 

PSM Makassar
Sports venues in Indonesia
Football venues in Indonesia
Athletics (track and field) venues in Indonesia
Multi-purpose stadiums in Indonesia
Sports venues in South Sulawesi
Football venues in South Sulawesi
Multi-purpose stadiums in South Sulawesi
Sports venues in Makassar
Football venues in Makassar
Multi-purpose stadiums in Makassar
Buildings and structures in South Sulawesi
Buildings and structures in Makassar
Stadiums under construction